National Highway 89 (NH 89) is a National Highway in India entirely within the state of Rajasthan.

See also
 List of National Highways in India (by Highway Number)
 List of National Highways in India

References

External links
  NH network map of India

89
National highways in India (old numbering)